Charmed is an American television series created by Constance M. Burge. In the United States, Charmed premiered on The WB on October 7, 1998 and ended on May 21, 2006, with 178 episodes. Charmed originally aired on Wednesday nights at 9:00 pm, before moving to Thursday nights for its second, third and fourth seasons. For the fifth season, the series moved to Sunday nights at 8:00 pm and remained there until its eighth and final season.

The first episode, "Something Wicca This Way Comes", garnered 7.7 million viewers and broke the record for the highest-rated debut episode for The WB. For its first three seasons, Charmed was the second-highest rated series on The WB, behind 7th Heaven. During its fifth season, Charmed became the highest-rated Sunday night program in The WB's history. By the end of its eighth season, Charmed had become the second-longest drama broadcast by The WB and broke the record for the longest running hour-long television series featuring all female leads, later overtaken in 2012 by Desperate Housewives.

Series overview

Episodes

Season 1 (1998–1999)

Season 2 (1999–2000)

Season 3 (2000–2001)

Season 4 (2001–2002)

Season 5 (2002–2003)

Season 6 (2003–2004)

Season 7 (2004–2005)

Season 8 (2005–2006)

Specials

Notes

Ratings

References

External links 
 

Charmed
Charmed

it:Streghe#Episodi
vi:Phép Thuật (Phần 2)